The first season of the American version of the music competition show  The X Factor began airing on Fox on September 21, 2011.

Based on the UK format, the competition consists of auditions, in front of producers and then the judges with a live audience; boot camp; judges' houses and then the live finals. Auditions for the show began in March 2011 and concluded in June 2011. The show was hosted by Welsh TV presenter Steve Jones, while the original judging panel consisted of Cowell, Cheryl Cole, Paula Abdul and L.A. Reid. Cole later departed from the show after just two audition rounds and was replaced by Nicole Scherzinger, who originally co-hosted with Jones.

An early preview of The X Factor aired during the 2011 Major League Baseball All-Star Game on July 12, 2011. Another preview was shown following NFL on Fox on September 11. The show was simultaneously broadcast in Canada on CTV or CTV Two, depending on schedule.

Season one's finale aired on December 22, 2011, resulting in Melanie Amaro as the winner, and Simon Cowell as the winning mentor.

Judges and hosts

At the time of announcing the USA show of The X Factor, Cowell was the only confirmed judge. He later said that he was taking the choices of whom to join him on the show very seriously, saying, "It's pointless hiring judges who don't know anything about the music business. I'll probably go and find someone who did what I did for a living. I was an A&R guy for 20 years." Eventually, Grammy Award-winning record executive, songwriter, and record producer L.A. Reid, The X Factor UK judge Cheryl Cole, and Cowell's former American Idol colleague Paula Abdul Numerous people were speculated to host the series, including High School Musical star Corbin Bleu and The X Factor UK host Dermot O'Leary. On May 8, 2011, Nicole Scherzinger and Welsh presenter Steve Jones were announced as co-hosts of the show.

On May 26, 2011, it was reported that Cole had been dropped from the show and was set to be replaced by Scherzinger. Reports varied over whether she was fired because American audiences had trouble understanding her accent, because of a lack of chemistry between her and Abdul, because Cole is unknown to American audiences, because Cole was confused with Sheryl Crow by American audiences, or that she had stepped down herself due to homesickness. Cole's departure was officially confirmed on June 6 in a statement from Fox, which also confirmed Scherzinger as her replacement. Jones would then serve as the sole presenter. On August 5, 2011, Cowell announced that the reason why Cole left was because he gave her the option to be a judge on the 2011 series of the UK show as he felt that she would have been comfortable there. He said that if her departure had anything to do with her not getting along with Abdul then he would not be judging the show. Cole later revealed in a 2012 interview that she had decided to quit the show of her accord and rejected Cowell's offer to return to the UK show after Tulisa already replaced her on the UK panel and her unwillingness to judge the UK show without Cowell. Cole later patched things up with Cowell in 2014 and she along with Cowell would both return as judges on the UK show for the 2014 UK series for the replacements of both Sharon Osbourne and Gary Barlow.

Selection process

Auditions

Auditions for producers began in Los Angeles, California, on March 27, 2011, at the Los Angeles Memorial Sports Arena. They then took place in Miami, Florida, on April 7, 2011, at the BankUnited Center and continued in Newark, New Jersey's Prudential Center on April 14, 2011. More auditions took place in Seattle, Washington's KeyArena on April 20, 2011, and Chicago, Illinois's Sears Centre on April 27, 2011, and finished in Dallas, Texas's American Airlines Center on May 26, 2011.

It was reported that The X Factor had broken the auditions record in Los Angeles, California on March 27.

The MyStudio HD audition booths opened in Honolulu, Hawaii; Phoenix, Arizona; Nashville, Tennessee; Anchorage, Alaska; Kansas City, Kansas; and Denver, Colorado. Originally scheduled to end on April 30, 2011, the booths' opening ended up being extended until May 8, 2011. After it was announced that people auditioning through this method was in such high demand, auditions at the booths' ended up being extended until May 15, 2011.

On June 3, Cowell announced that applicants could upload a video of them singing onto YouTube and it was opened for one week only (June 9). Selected applicants would appear in front of the judges.

The last set of auditions took place during May and June 2011. These auditions individually occur simultaneously before both the judges and a live studio audience; and with such audience in attendance able to applaud/cheer approval or disapproval and perhaps influencing the judges.

Auditions footage first aired on September 21, though they were not aired in the same order that they occurred.

Boot camp
Day one of boot camp started with dance training with choreographer Brian Friedman and then the acts were called to the stage in groups of 10 to sing in front of the judges. After all of them performed, the acts were brought in front of the judges as part of one of three groups. Two of these groups made it through and one was eliminated, leaving 100 acts still in the competition. The judges threw a party for the remaining acts that for many lasted late into the night.

Day two started with everyone getting woken up at 6:00am and heading to meet Reid. He informed them that they would be put into "ensembles" and groups, and would be working with stylists, choreographers, and vocal coaches. They were given five hours to learn the songs they were given. One third of the acts would be eliminated by the end of the second day. Several of the ensembles performances were aired. The first ensemble performed "Creep", the second ensemble performed "I Still Haven't Found What I'm Looking For", the third ensemble performed "Desperado", the fourth ensemble performed "Wishing on a Star", the fifth ensemble performed "Superman (It's Not Easy)", the sixth ensemble performed "Feeling Good", the seventh ensemble performed "I Have Nothing" and the eighth ensemble performed "Run".

Day two continued with more ensembles performing for the judges. The ninth ensemble performed "What's Going On". Next, they showed a couple of quick shots of some ensembles, presumably consisting of all people that would not make it through to the end. The tenth ensemble that was covered in detail performed "I Won't Let Go". The eleventh (and final) ensemble performed "Chasing Cars". Next, the judges deliberated, and decided on which a third of the acts would be eliminated. Once again, three groups were brought in. Group 1 was eliminated, meaning groups 2 and 3 made it through to the next round of boot camp.

Day three had all 64 acts perform for the judges. They were given a list of 35 songs at the end of the day two and were told to choose one that best represented them. At the end of this final boot camp round, 32 acts would go through to judges' houses. This final performance was done in front of a crowd of 3,000 people. After each of the performances, the judges gave no feedback.

The first boot camp episode aired on October 5, 2011 and covered the first two days of boot camp. The second bootcamp episode aired on October 6 and covered the rest of day two and the remainder of bootcamp. By the end of bootcamp, 162 acts were cut to 32, 8 acts in each category. The judges later found out which category they would mentor and their acts joined them at their house.

Judges' houses
Enrique Iglesias helped Scherzinger select  her finalists in Malibu, California and Pharrell Williams acted as a guest judge helping Abdul to pick her finalists in Santa Barbara, California. Rihanna helped Reid choose his finalists in The Hamptons, New York. Mariah Carey was contracted to aid Cowell in France, but was unable to attend due to Hurricane Irene grounding her flight to Paris, so Cowell was instead assisted by three vocal coaches.

In the United States, footage from judges' houses was originally scheduled to air on October 12, 13 and 18. However, due to weather delaying the start of the 2011 American League Championship Series, the footage from judges' houses 1 was moved to October 13, with footage from judges' houses 2 seen instead on October 16. The footage from judges' houses 3 aired on October 18 as scheduled and featured footage of the judges revealing their four finalists (or five in the case of Cowell) in each category to take through to the live shows. In Canada, the judges' houses 1 episode was broadcast as originally scheduled on October 12. No episode was shown in Canada on October 13, with CTV and CTV Two opting to follow Fox's scheduling changes to take advantage of simultaneous substitution rules.

{| class="wikitable plainrowheaders"
|+Summary of judges' houses
|-
! Judge
! Category
! Location
! Assistant(s)
! Acts Eliminated
|-
!scope="row"| Abdul
| Groups
| Santa Barbara, California
| Pharrell Williams
| 2Squar'd4ShoreThe AnserIllusion Confusion
|-
!scope="row"| Cowell
| Girls
| France
| Three vocal coaches
| Melanie AmaroCaitlin KochJazzlyn LittleTora Woloshin
|-
!scope="row"| Reid
| Boys
| The Hamptons, New York
| Rihanna
| Skyelor AndersonTim CifersBrennin HuntNick Voss
|-
!scope="row"| Scherzinger
| Over 30s
| Malibu, California
| Enrique Iglesias
| Tiger BudbillChrista CollinsElaine GibbsJames Kenney
|}

Melanie Amaro was initially eliminated from the Girls' category, but was invited back to the competition after Cowell decided he had made a mistake in not including her, bringing the total number of contestants to 17.

Acts
The final seventeen acts were confirmed as follows;

Key:
 – Winner
 – Runner-Up
 Wildcard (Live Shows)

 Act who died years later.

Live shows
The first two-and-a-half hour live show aired on a special Tuesday time slot on October 25; which followed the same format as the 2011 series of the UK show with each of the judges narrowing their number of acts down to three, without a public vote. The public vote started with the following performance and results shows starting November 2, which aired on Wednesdays and Thursdays respectively (except for the live shows on November 22 and 23, that aired on Tuesday and Wednesday respectively during Thanksgiving). The two-part finale was held on December 21 and 22.

There was no guest performance during the first week. The second live result show featured a performance from Outasight. Jessie J and Willow Smith performed on the third live results show, while the fourth live results show featured a performance from Rihanna. Kelly Clarkson and Bruno Mars performed on the fifth live result show while Tinie Tempah performed on the sixth live result show. Mary J. Blige and Lenny Kravitz performed on the seventh live results show while Florence + The Machine and The X Factor USA judge Nicole Scherzinger performed on the semi-final results show. The final featured performances from Justin Bieber, Leona Lewis, 50 Cent, Stevie Wonder, Pitbull and Ne-Yo.

Results summary
Color key
 Act in team Paula Abdul

 Act in team Simon Cowell

 Act in team Nicole Scherzinger

 Act in team L.A. Reid

 There was no public vote in the first week. Each mentor had to select three of their own acts to advance to the second week.

Live show details

Week 1 (October 25)

 There was no public vote in the first week. Instead, each of the judges voted to eliminate one (or two for Cowell) of their own acts.

Judges' votes to eliminate
Reid: Phillip Lomax – gave no reason.
Abdul: The Brewer Boys – gave no reason.
Scherzinger: Dexter Haygood – gave no reason.
Cowell: Simone Battle and Tiah Tolliver – after Drew and Rachel Crow were saved, the decision came down to Battle, Tolliver and Melanie Amaro; Cowell believed that Amaro had the potential to win the competition.

Week 2 (November 2/3)
Theme: American Anthems
Group performance: "Without You"
Musical guest: Outasight ("Tonight Is the Night")

Judges' votes to eliminate

Cowell: The Stereo Hogzz – based on the final showdown performance.
Abdul: InTENsity – based her decision on her experience working with both groups.
Scherzinger: InTENsity – believed that The Stereo Hogzz were more prepared.
Reid: InTENsity – gave no reason.

However, voting statistics revealed that InTENsity received more votes than The Stereo Hogzz which meant that if Reid sent the result to deadlock, InTENsity would have been saved and The Stereo Hogzz would have been eliminated.

Week 3 (November 9/10)
Theme: Songs from movies
Group performance: "Save the World"
Musical guests: Willow Smith ("Fireball") and Jessie J ("Domino")

Judges' votes to eliminate

Reid: The Stereo Hogzz – said he did not like their song choices through the competition.
Scherzinger: The Stereo Hogzz – based on her support of "female empowerment", even though she liked both groups.
Abdul: Lakoda Rayne – originally wanted to abstain from voting, but Jones told her that if she abstained, Cowell would vote before Abdul but later reiterated that if she abstained, The Stereo Hogzz would have automatically been eliminated by default as Reid and Scherzinger had already voted to eliminate The Stereo Hogzz and Cowell would not be required to vote, she eventually voted to keep The Stereo Hogzz to give Cowell an opportunity to send the result to deadlock.
Cowell: The Stereo Hogzz – based on who he thought had a greater potential to win the competition.

Week 4 (November 16/17)
Theme: Rock
Group performance: "We Will Rock You"
Musical guest: Rihanna ("We Found Love")

Judges' votes to eliminate

Reid: Stacy Francis – backed his own act, Astro.
Scherzinger: Astro – backed her own act, Stacy Francis.
Abdul: Stacy Francis – gave no reason.
Cowell: Stacy Francis – despite chastising Astro for his attitude and not showing respect, he thought Astro had a better chance of winning the competition.

However, voting statistics revealed that Francis received more votes than Astro which meant that if Cowell sent the result to deadlock, Francis would have been saved and Astro would have been eliminated.

Week 5 (November 22/23)
Theme: Giving Thanks
Group performance: "Raise Your Glass" / "So What"
Musical guests: Kelly Clarkson ("Stronger (What Doesn't Kill You)") and Bruno Mars ("It Will Rain")
The Pepsi Choice Group performance was chosen by the audience and included circus outfits along with a rotating stage and laser special effects in a hip-hop dance style.

Two acts were eliminated during the results show. The three acts with the fewest public votes were announced, and the act with the fewest votes was automatically eliminated. The remaining two acts then performed in the final showdown and faced the judges' votes.

Judges' votes to eliminate

Reid: LeRoy Bell – backed his own act, Marcus Canty, whom he said was the most consistent of the two.
Scherzinger: Marcus Canty – backed her own act, LeRoy Bell.
Abdul: Marcus Canty – based on the final showdown performance.
Cowell: LeRoy Bell – could not decide and sent the result to deadlock; despite saying Bell sang better in the final showdown while Canty had done better overall in the competition.

With the acts in the sing-off receiving two votes each, the result went to deadlock and reverted to the earlier public vote. Bell was eliminated as the act with the fewest public votes.

Week 6 (November 30/December 1)
Theme: Songs by Michael Jackson
Group performance: "Man in the Mirror"
Musical guest: Tinie Tempah ("Pass Out")

Michael Jackson's mother, Katherine; his three children Prince, Paris, and Blanket; and his brothers Marlon, Tito, and Jackie were present in the audience during the performance show.

As in the previous week, two acts were eliminated during the results show. The three acts with the fewest public votes were announced, and the act with the fewest votes was automatically eliminated. The remaining two acts then performed in the final showdown and faced the judges' votes.

Judges' votes to eliminate

Reid: Drew – backed his own act, Marcus Canty.
Cowell: Marcus Canty – backed his own act, Drew, while also taking responsibility for her being in the final showdown.
Scherzinger: Drew – felt that Canty gave a more emotional final showdown performance.
Abdul: Drew – said that Canty's final showdown performance moved her more.

However, voting statistics revealed that Drew received more votes than Canty which meant that if Abdul sent the result to deadlock, Drew would have advanced to the quarter-final and Canty would have been eliminated.

Week 7: Quarter-Final (December 7/8)
Themes: Dance music hits; contestant's choice
Musical guests: Mary J. Blige ("Need Someone") and Lenny Kravitz ("Rock Star City Life" and "Are You Gonna Go My Way")

Nervo served as the house DJs for the first song of the night. Originally, the second song was going to be chosen by the public as part of the Pepsi Challenge, however, due to technical problems that happened with the Pepsi Challenge the night before the performance show, that feature was delayed to the semi-final and executive producers told that the contestants had only 24 hours to choose another song.

Judges' votes to eliminate

Reid: Rachel Crow – backed his own act, Marcus Canty.
Cowell: Marcus Canty – gave no reason, but effectively backed his own act, Rachel Crow.
Abdul: Marcus Canty – said that Crow's final showdown performance blew her away.
Scherzinger: Rachel Crow – could not decide and sent the result to deadlock.

With the acts in the sing-off receiving two votes each, the result went to deadlock and reverted to the earlier public vote. Crow was eliminated as the act with the fewest public votes.

Week 8: Semi-Final (December 14/15)
Themes: Pepsi Challenge songs, "songs to get you to the final" (no theme)
Group performance: "No Diggity" / "Shout"
Musical guests: Nicole Scherzinger ("Pretty") and Florence and the Machine ("Spectrum (Say My Name)")
Each act performed two songs.

The semi-final did not feature a final showdown and instead the act with the fewest public votes, Canty, was automatically eliminated.

Week 9: Final (December 21/22)
The final lasted for 1.5 hours on Wednesday, December 21 and 2 hours on Thursday, December 22.

December 21
Themes: Celebrity duets; winner's song (billed as "$5 million song")
Group performance: "They Don't Care About Us" (with Cirque du Soleil's Michael Jackson: The Immortal World Tour)

December 22
Theme: Christmas songs
Group performances: "The Edge of Glory" (all top 12 contestants) and "Heroes" (performed by Melanie Amaro and Josh Krajcik)
Musical guests: Justin Bieber with Stevie Wonder and Drew ("The Christmas Song" / "Santa Claus Is Coming to Town"), Leona Lewis ("Run"), 50 Cent with Astro ("Wait Until Tonight" / "In da Club") and Pitbull featuring Ne-Yo with Marcus Canty ("International Love" / "Give Me Everything")

Contestants Who Appeared on Other Shows or Seasons

 James Kenney auditioned again for Season 3.  He was eliminated on the first live show.
 InTENsity members Arin Ray and Ellona Santiago returned in later seasons as solo acts.  Ray finished in 10th place on Season 2, and Santiago finished in 6th place on Season 3
 Caitlin Koch auditioned for Season 10 of American Idol.  She was eliminated during the groups round in Hollywood Week.
 Stacy Francis appeared on Celebrity Big Brother 19 (UK).  She was the sixth house guest evicted.
 Hayley Orrantia of Lakoda Rayne later landed a starring role on the ABC sitcom The Goldbergs.
 Josh Kaufman was on Star Search at 16 as a junior vocalist. After he was eliminated in the first season's live show, he auditioned again in The Voice at the sixth season, where he was later crowned that season’s winner.

Famous Relations
 Gina Rene, who was cut during the Boot Camp round, is the older sister of fellow contestant Chris Rene.

Deaths
 Simone Battle, who was eliminated during the first live show, committed suicide on September 5, 2014.

Reception

U.S. Nielsen ratings

Notes

Controversy

Nicole Scherzinger

Scherzinger had been proven to be a unpopular judge, with her performance during her one-season stint being panned by critics, as well as early controversy of her replacing Cheryl Cole on the judging panel.

In the quarter-final result show, Scherzinger who had the deciding vote, was clearly upset with the bottom two acts (Rachel Crow and Marcus Canty) because she admired both acts and was undecided about how she would vote. Her vote either meant that if she would eliminate Canty, Canty would be eliminated or if she voted against Crow, the result would go to deadlock and the public vote would determine the result. While Scherzinger was deliberating, she wanted the public vote to decide the outcome that week and sent the result to deadlock. Following this, Crow was voted out which led to Crow breaking down on stage and Scherzinger was booed off the stage and her future on the show was put in jeopardy. She subsequently received death threats from some viewers. Scherzinger was let go at the end of the season and later relocated to the United Kingdom to be a judge on the 2012 series of the UK show to replace Kelly Rowland. On the UK show, Scherzinger became a successful and popular judge.

References

External links
Official website

Season 1
2011 American television seasons
United States 01